Hongotoxin (HgTX) is an ion channel toxin, which blocks Shaker-type (Kv1) K+ channels. The toxin is derived from the venom of Centruroides limbatus, a Central American scorpion found meanly in Costa Rica, Honduras and Panama.

Chemistry
Hongotoxin belongs to the short scorpion toxin superfamily. Potassium channel inhibitor family. Alpha-KTx 2 subfamily.

There are five subtypes known of the hongotoxin peptide. HgTX1 is 39 amino acids long and shows an overall amino acid sequence homology of 89% to margatoxin (MgTX).

Target
Hongotoxin (HgTX) targets are Shaker-type (Kv1) K+ channels.

HgTX1 shows high affinity with Kv1.1, Kv1.2, Kv1.3 voltage-gated potassium channels, but much lower affinity with Kv1.6 (see table 1 and 2).

HgTX2, HgTX3, HgTX4 and HgTX5 are potent selective inhibitors of Kv1 voltage-gated potassium channels (By similarity).

ND, not determined. All measurements in pM

All measurements in pM

Mode of action
The mode of action is not yet known.

References

External links

Neurotoxins
Ion channel toxins
Scorpion toxins